Haroldiella is a genus of flowering plants belonging to the family Urticaceae.

Its native range is Tubuai.

Species
Species:

Haroldiella rapaensis 
Haroldiella sykesii

References

Urticaceae
Urticaceae genera